Šmíd (feminine Šmídová) is a Czech surname, Czechized form of German surname Schmidt. Notable people include:

 Jaroslav Šmíd, Czech volleyball player
 Ladislav Šmíd, Czech ice hockey player
 Lenka Šmídová, Czech sailor
 Marie Šmídová, Czech table tennis player
 Martin Šmíd, Czech fictitious university student
 Michal Šmíd, Czech footballer
 Miroslav Šmíd, Czech rock climber
 Pavla Šmídová, Czech volleyball player
 Tomáš Šmíd, Czech tennis player
 Zdeněk Šmíd, Czech ice hockey player

 John Smid, former director of the Memphis, Tennessee ex-gay ministry Love In Action

Czech-language surnames
Surnames of German origin